Missouri Pacific Depot is a historic train station located at Charleston, Mississippi County, Missouri.  It was built in 1916-1917 by the Missouri Pacific Railroad, and is a one-story, rectangular brick building with white, smooth-cut limestone wainscotting. The building measures 24 feet by 149 feet, 4 inches. It had a red tile hipped roof with a seven foot wide overhang.

It was added to the National Register of Historic Places in 1972.

References

Railway stations on the National Register of Historic Places in Missouri
Railway stations in the United States opened in 1917
National Register of Historic Places in Mississippi County, Missouri
Charleston
Former railway stations in Missouri